Starksia multilepis, the manyscaled blenny, is a species of labrisomid blenny only known from reefs of the Atol das Rocas and Fernando de Noronha Island off the coast of Brazil where it is found at depths of about .  This species can reach a length of  SL.

References

multilepis
Fish described in 2003